Caroline Chomienne (5 November 1957 – 10 September 2020) was a French film director and producer.

Biography
Chomienne's first feature film which she directed was Les Surprises de l'amour, released in 1988. She was a member of the Collectif 50/50 association, which aims to promote equality between men and women in the film industry.

Filmography

Short films
Un tournage de Raul Ruiz (1983)
Lettre à Ahmat (2001)
Cours plus vite que la vie (2016)

Feature films
Les Surprises de l'amour (1988)
Des lendemains qui chantent (1996)
Freestyle (2002)
Antigone sans terre (2005)
Véra (2016)
La Leçon de danse (2018)
Cuba no, Cuba si (2018)

References

1957 births
2020 deaths
French film directors